Chip Hayes (born December 15, 1956) is an American soap opera writer, producer, and director.

Personal life
He is married to actress Deborah Adair, with whom he has two adopted children.

He is the son of Nancy Gates and William Hayes.

Positions held
All My Children (hired by Megan McTavish and later rehired by Ginger Smith)
 Head writer: Fall 2013 (with Lisa Connor as co-head writer) 
 Script writer (March 25, 2008 - February 12, 2010; December 29, 2010 - September 23, 2011; April 29, 2013 – present) 
 Associate head writer (January 7, 2004 - January 14, 2008; February 17, 2010 - January 5, 2011)

General Hospital (hired by Anne Howard Bailey)
 Breakdown Writer: 1985 - 1990

Melrose Place (hired by Darren Star)
 Producer: 1992-1998
 Director: 1992-1998
 Script writer: 1994-1998

The Young and the Restless (hired by William J. Bell)
 Breakdown writer: 1983 - 1985

Awards  and nominations
Nominated for a Daytime Emmy Award in 2004 and 2012.

References

External links 

 

Soap opera producers
American male television writers
Place of birth missing (living people)
American soap opera writers
American television producers
1956 births
Living people